Reflections in a Dark Sky (Italian: Riflessi in un cielo scuro) is a 1991 Italian drama film written and directed by Salvatore Maira.

Cast 

 Françoise Fabian as Valeria
 Anna Kanakis as Chim
 Valerie Perrine  as Caterina
 Peter Stormare  as  Carlo
 Maurizio Donadoni	 as  Mario
 Brigitte Christensen  as Sister Angela
 Stefano Madia as  Friend of Chim
 Bettina Giovannini  as Alice
 Vittorio Mezzogiorno

References

External links

1991 films
Italian drama films
1991 drama films
1990s Italian films